The Épanchoir de Foucaud is a small botanical garden located in Pennautier just outside Carcassonne, Aude, Languedoc-Roussillon, France. It contains a collection of Mediterranean plants set about an épanchoir of the Canal du Midi, that is, a spillway for the canal's excess water. The garden is open daily without charge.

See also 
 Canal du Midi
 List of botanical gardens in France

References 
 Canal du Midi - Pennautier (French)
 Carcassonne Tourisme brochure (French)
 France, le trésor des régions - Cantons de Carcassonne (French)
 History of the Canal du Midi at Carcassonne

Gardens in Aude
Botanical gardens in France